The Karantina massacre (Arabic: مجزرة الكرنتينا, French: Massacre de La Quarantaine/Karantina) took place on January 18, 1976, early in the Lebanese Civil War. La Quarantaine, known in Arabic as Karantina, was a Muslim-inhabited district in mostly Christian East Beirut controlled by forces of the Palestine Liberation Organization (PLO), and inhabited by Palestinians, Kurds, Syrians, Armenians and Lebanese Shiites. The fighting and subsequent killings also involved an old quarantine area near the port and nearby Maslakh quarter. According to then-Washington Post-correspondent Jonathan Randal, "Many Lebanese Muslim men and boys were rounded up and separated from the women and children and massacred," while the women and young girls were violently raped and robbed.

Karantina was overrun by militias of the right-wing and mostly Christian Lebanese Front, specifically the Kataeb Party (Phalangists), resulting in the deaths of approximately 1,500 people, mostly Lebanese Muslims. After Kataeb Regulatory Forces (KRF), Guardians of the Cedars (GoC), NLP Tiger militia and Lebanese Youth Movement (LYM) forces took control of the Karantina district on 18 January 1976, Tel al-Zaatar was placed under siege, leading to the Tel al-Zaatar massacre.

The Damour massacre was a reprisal for the Karantina massacre.

See also
 List of massacres in Lebanon

References

Sources
 Chomsky, Noam (1989) Necessary Illusions: Thought Control in Democratic Societies South End Press, 
 Fisk, Robert (2001) Pity the Nation: Lebanon at War Oxford University Press,
 William Harris, (1996) Faces of Lebanon. Sects, Wars, and Global Extensions Markus Wiener Publishers, Princeton, USA 

1976 in Lebanon
Battles of the Lebanese Civil War
Conflicts in 1976
Massacres of the Lebanese Civil War
Mass murder in 1976
Massacres in 1976
Persecution of Muslims by Christians
January 1976 events in Asia
Violence against Muslims
Massacres of Muslims
History of Beirut
1976 murders in Lebanon